Scytinium tetrasporum is a species of lichen belonging to the family Collemataceae.

References

Peltigerales
Lichen species
Taxa named by Theodor Magnus Fries
Lichens described in 1865